Glyphipterix macrodrachma is a species of sedge moth in the genus Glyphipterix. It was described by Alexey Diakonoff in 1979. It is found in China.

References

Moths described in 1979
Glyphipterigidae
Moths of Asia